Khalapur Assembly constituency was one of the 288 assembly constituencies of  Maharashtra a western state of India. Khalapur was also part of Kolaba Lok Sabha constituency. Khalapur seat existed till  2004 elections.

Member of Legislative Assembly

See also
 Kolaba Lok Sabha constituency
 Shriwardhan Assembly constituency
 List of constituencies of Maharashtra Legislative Assembly

References

Raigad district
Former assembly constituencies of Maharashtra